Campbeltown (or ) is a town and former royal burgh in Argyll and Bute, Scotland. It lies by Campbeltown Loch on the Kintyre peninsula. Campbeltown became an important centre for Scotch whisky, and a busy fishing port.

The 2018 population estimate was 4,600 indicating a reduction since the 2011 census.

History

Originally known as Kinlochkilkerran (an anglicization of the Gaelic, which means 'head of the loch by the kirk of Ciarán'), Campbeltown was renamed in the 17th century as Campbell's Town after Archibald Campbell (Earl of Argyle) was granted the site in 1667. Campbeltown Town Hall was completed in 1760.

Whisky
Campbeltown is one of five areas in Scotland categorised as a distinct malt whisky producing region, and is home to the Campbeltown single malts. At one point it had over 30 distilleries and proclaimed itself "the whisky capital of the world". However, a focus on quantity rather than quality, and the combination of Prohibition and the Great Depression in the United States, led to most distilleries going out of business. Today only three active distilleries remain in Campbeltown: Glen Scotia, Glengyle, and Springbank.

Campbeltown is a "protected locality" for Scotch Whisky distilling under the UK's Scotch Whisky Regulations 2009.

The folk song titled "Campbeltown Loch, I wish you were whisky" is based on the town's history in this industry.

Economy

In addition to the benefits of distilling, and whisky tourism, there were two major employers in 2018, Campbeltown Creamery and CS Wind UK, who provided "a substantial portion of the Campbeltown area’s high skilled jobs and are a vital part of the local economy," according to the Scottish government. A report in October 2019 had raised warning signs for the economy of Argyle & Bute; the report also suggested that up to 70 jobs at CS Wind UK could be lost but did not specify a time frame.
 
Both companies confirmed the prediction of job redundancies, leading the Scottish government to hold an emergency summit in November 2019 to discuss steps that might be taken for improving the local economy. Participants included Argyll & Bute Council, Highlands & Islands Enterprise, trades unions and local employers. After the summit, a "working group" was formed in late November 2019.

The number of dairy farms supplying Campbeltown Creamery reduced from 147 to 28 and the number of dairy cows fell from 6600 to 2500. Consequently, the Creamery became unviable. A plan by a small number of local dairy farmers to take over the running of the Creamery failed in early December 2019. The milk produced in Kintyre is now transported by road tankers to Lockerbie and Mull of Kintyre Cheddar is no longer available.

By early December 2019, CS Wind UK had declared 22 jobs redundant. The Scottish government was working with the company to search for long-term solutions. Preliminary discussions did not produce optimism about the future stability of the company. The Unite union indicated that while CS Wind had been profitable, it was not receiving an adequate number of orders to sustain full employment. The plant was shut down in 2019 and production shifted to CS Wind's cheaper Vietnam plant in Phú Mỹ.

Culture

Campbeltown boasts a museum and a heritage centre. The museum has a varied collection of items from Campbeltown's past, and prehistoric items excavated from sites around Kintyre, such as axeheads, jewellery and combs. The 19th century building, by John James Burnet, also houses the Registrars office and Customer Service Point for Argyll and Bute council and has plaques or exhibits related to famous Kintyre people: for example, William McTaggart and William Mackinnon. Near the museum is the cinema known as the Wee Picture House, a small but distinctive Art Nouveau building of the Glasgow School dating from 1913 and believed to be the oldest surviving purpose-built cinema in Scotland. These buildings are on the waterfront, as is a 14th-century Celtic cross that also served as a mercat cross.

St Kieran (Ciarán of Clonmacnoise) lived in this area before the town existed. A cave named after him can be visited at low tide, as can the cave on nearby Island Davaar where pilgrims and tourists go to see a 19th-century crucifixion painting.

Campbeltown also hosts the annual Mull Of Kintyre Music Festival, which has seen acts ranging from up-and-coming local bands to well-established groups such as Deacon Blue, The Stranglers and Idlewild perform.

The Kintyre Songwriters Festival, a fairly low key annual gathering aimed at promoting the wealth and variety of original music across the area, which started in 2009. The festival is held during the last weekend of May and is open to anyone interested in performing.

On Friday 16 June 2006, First Minister Jack McConnell flew to Campbeltown to officially open Campbeltown's new 'Aqualibrium' Centre. Aqualibrium, designed by Page\Park Architects, replaced the old Campbeltown swimming pool, which was previously closed due to safety concerns; the centre houses Campbeltown's library (with the old building being the museum only), swimming pool, gym, conference centre and 'Mussel Ebb' Cafe.

The Kintyre Camanachd are a local shinty team that belongs to the Camanachd Association.

Argyll FM is a local radio station based in Campbeltown on 106.5, 107.1 and 107.7.

In May 2012 Campbeltown and Dunoon were jointly named in a report by the Scottish Agricultural College as the rural places in Scotland most vulnerable to a downturn. The "vulnerability index" ranked 90 Scottish locations according to factors associated with economic and social change.

Transport
Campbeltown Airport is near the town, and has a scheduled service to/from Glasgow International Airport on weekdays and some summer Sundays.

The town is the westernmost town in the island of Great Britain (if the port of Mallaig is not counted as a town). It has the population of a large village, but lays claim to its town status based on its port and its central close grid of streets. Its position near the end of a long peninsula makes for a time-consuming road journey, and to some extent the area relies on sea and air transport, like the Inner Hebrides. However it is linked to the rest of Scotland by the A83 (to Tarbet) and A82 (from Tarbet to Glasgow). Bus service is provided by West Coast Motors.

Ferries sail from Campbeltown to Ballycastle in Northern Ireland, operated by Kintyre Express. The service, which runs to Ballycastle every Friday to Monday during summer months and on Mondays and Fridays during the winter months, commenced in 2011.

In 2006 a foot passenger ferry operated by Kintyre Express ran between Campbeltown and Troon every Monday, Wednesday and Friday with a crossing time of one hour in calm weather. By 2007 this ferry no longer ran, although the vessel can be chartered privately.

Starting 23 May 2013, Caledonian MacBrayne began operating a pilot ferry service across the Firth of Clyde to Ardrossan calling at Brodick on Saturdays.

Campbeltown was linked to Machrihanish by a canal (1794 – mid-1880s) that was superseded by the Campbeltown and Machrihanish Light Railway, which closed in 1932. The railway, which was originally built to serve the Machrihanish Coalfield, ran from Campbeltown railway station to Machrihanish railway station.

Language
Campbeltown is one of the few communities in the Scottish Highlands where the Scots language predominated in recent centuries, rather than the previously widespread Scottish Gaelic, an enclave of Lowland Scots speech surrounded by Highland Scottish speech.

Notable people

Alexander Beith, minister and author in Gaelic and English. Free Church Moderator
Hugh Henry Brackenridge, American writer, lawyer, judge, and justice of the Pennsylvania Supreme Court
John Campbell Mitchell, landscape artist
T. Lindsay Galloway, civil and mining engineer and coal master of Argyll Colliery
James Gulliver, founder of Argyll Foods
Sir William Mackinnon, 1st Baronet, Scottish ship-owner and businessman
Norman Macleod (Caraid nan Gaidheal), Scottish divine and miscellaneous writer, served at the parish of Campbeltown, father of Norman Macleod (below)
Norman Macleod, Scottish clergyman and author
Angus MacVicar, author and broadcaster
Neil McBain, professional footballer and football manager
Paul McCartney, musician, singer, songwriter, ex-member of the Beatles and an ex-leader of Wings, owns a farm (named High Park) near the town
Jill McGown, British writer of mystery novels
Duncan McNab McEachran, Canadian veterinarian and academic
Dan McPhail, professional footballer who made 437 appearances in the Football League
William McTaggart, landscape artist
Denzil Meyrick, author of Kinloch novels
John Neil Munro, journalist and author of biographies
Rodney Pattisson, English yachtsman
George Pirie, artist who was associated with the Glasgow Boys in the 1880s
Kieran Prendergast, diplomat and a former Under-Secretary-General for Political Affairs at the United Nations
Bob Pursell, footballer who played for Liverpool F.C. in the early 20th century
Peter Pursell, footballer. he won one cap for Scotland in 1914
Very Rev James Curdie Russell, Moderator of the General Assembly of the Church of Scotland minister of Campbeltown
Angus Stewart, Lord Stewart, lawyer and Senator of the College of Justice, a judge of the Supreme Courts of Scotland
John Stewart, Australian politician
Gerald Tait, Olympic sailor
Lawrence Tynes, placekicker in the National Football League. Grew up in Campbeltown when his father was with the US Navy
George Wylie, member of the Wisconsin State Assembly and State Senate

Town twinnings
Campbeltown is twinned with Kümmersbruck, Bavaria, Germany.

Gallery

Climate
As with the rest of Scotland, Campbeltown experiences a maritime climate with cool summers and mild winters.

The lowest temperature to be reported in recent years was  during December 2010.

See also

 Lochend Castle, Campbeltown
 Charles Campbell (member for Campbeltown)
 Hazelburn distillery
 HMS Minona

References

External links 

Come to Campbeltown
Campbeltown Website
Campbeltown Courier - source for local news
Mull Of Kintyre Music Festival- official site
Kintyre Songwriters Festival- official site
The Picture House

 
Towns in Argyll and Bute
Scots language
Royal burghs
Ports and harbours of Scotland
Fishing communities in Scotland
Plantations (settlements or colonies)
Kintyre
Firth of Clyde
Populated coastal places in Scotland